Mark Allison (born 6 December 1960 in Ayr, Queensland) is an Australian agricultural industry manager. He is a chief executive officer and managing director of Elders Limited and holds several other positions at the industry organizations.

Biography

Early life
Mark Allison was born on 6 December 1960 in Ayr, Queensland in a sugarcane and beef cattle family. He was raised in Townsville. Allison attended Bracken Ridge State High School and was elected School Captain in 1977.

Education
Allison completed an Agriculture Science Degree (1982) and Bachelor of Economics (1986) at the University of Queensland followed by a Graduate Diploma of Management at Central Queensland University (1989). Allison also completed an Advanced Management Program at Harvard Business School in 2012.

Business career 
Allison started professional life as a research agronomist in Moree working with irrigated cotton and dryland broadacre crops. He specialised in crop protection and nutrition in this role and moved to Toowoomba where he pioneered the rainfastness methodology for ammonium sulphate use with glyphosate to reduce the rainfastness period and incompatibility problems for tank mixes with glyphosate. Monsanto acknowledged this work with an “Outstanding Achievement” presented to Allison in 1987.

Following a number of executive roles with crop protection, animal health and fertiliser companies, Allison was appointed to the role of General Manager of Fertiliser of Incitec in 1996 and became a Managing Director of CropCare Australasia in 1997.

In April 2001, Allison joined Wesfarmers as the Deputy Managing Director of Wesfarmers CSBP and was appointed Managing Director of CSBP in August 2001. In July 2002, he was appointed a Managing Director of Wesfarmers Landmark. After completing the sale of Wesfarmers Landmark to AWB Limited in 2003, Allison left the business and founded an Agricultural Business Consultancy business called Gouldian Management Services.

In December 2003, he joined Makhteshim-Agan and in 2004 completed a project to provide globally leading generic crop protection company Makteshim Agan an entry platform into the Australian and New Zealand market. It resulted with the acquisition of Farmoz in Australia and the greenfield entry with Agronica into the New Zealand market. Allison completed this acquisition and entry and was appointed Managing Director and CEO of the newly formed Makteshim Agan Australasia.

In May 2007, he took the position of a CEO of the Jeminex Group, a provider of industrial components. As the managing director of Jeminex Group, Allison initiated several acquisitions, aiming to build a diversified industrial group and bring the company to market.

Allison became a director of the Elders Limited in 2009. In September 2010, he was appointed Chief Executive Officer of GrainGrowers, a national grain producer organisation, and for some time served in both roles.
 
In June 2013, Allison was appointed a chairman of the Elders. In April 2014, following the election of a new chairman, he was appointed a managing director of the Elders. He consequently stepped down from the position of GrainGrowers's CEO, but remained in board as a non-executive director.

Government bodies 
In 2000, Allison was appointed a board member of the National Registration Authority for Agricultural and Veterinary Chemicals (currently Australian Pesticides and Veterinary Medicines Authority, APVMA). From 2007 to 2012, Allison served as the Chair of the APVMA Advisory Board.

Industry organizations 
Throughout his career, Allison has played an active role in the industry. He became a director of Avcare (the Crop Protection and Animal Health representative body) in November 1997, and Chairman in October 1999. Allison remained Chairman of Avcare until December 2006, when it was transformed into a pure crop protection body as CropLife Australia. Allison was appointed a director and Chairman of CropLife as part of the transition from Avcare and stepped down as Chairman in June, 2007. He was appointed a Life Member of CropLife at this time.

Allison was also appointed as a director and Chairman of Agsafe in December 1997 and February 2006 and served in this role until he stood down in June 2007.

In 2009, Allison became the CEO of BRI Australia, a subsidiary of an influential grain industry organisation Grain Growers Limited (GrainGrowers), and in September 2010 he was appointed GrainGrowers CEO. He was the CEO of GrainGrowers until 2014.

In August 2012, he was appointed a director of Grain Technology Australia, a not-for-profit, registered charity representing the grain, flour milling, baking and allied industries of Australia. In 2015, Allison was elected chairman of Agribusiness Australia.

Music

Allison is a self taught guitarist and singer songwriter, recording under the name of “mallison”. He has composed 144 original songs, and has recorded ten albums. Allison writes in multiple genres including, folk, country, rock, reggae, rap, electronic and Latin styles.

References

External links
 

Australian food industry businesspeople
21st-century Australian businesspeople
Australian chief executives
Australian corporate directors
Businesspeople from Queensland
1960 births
University of Queensland alumni
Central Queensland University alumni
Living people